George Evans (born 13 December 1994) is an English professional footballer who plays as a centre-back for Millwall.

Career
Evans was born in Cheadle, Greater Manchester and joined Manchester City at the age of six. After several seasons in Manchester City's academy, Evans first came to prominence with several appearances on the bench for City during the 2012–13 season, although he was ultimately not given a debut for the senior team. In the following season, Evans began playing for the Elite Development Squad before being loaned to Crewe Alexandra at the end of October. Within a week he was given his first senior cap, being named in the starting line-up for Crewe's home league game against Bradford City, against whom he played a full 90 minutes. Evans' first goal for Crewe Alexandra came on 23 November against local rivals Port Vale.

On 30 January 2015, he joined Scunthorpe United on loan until the end of the season. Evans made 16 appearances during his loan spell, scoring once. On 22 September 2015, Evans made his First Team debut for Manchester City when he came on as a substitute during a 4–1 win against Sunderland in the League Cup. In doing so, he became the second Manchester City player to represent the club at all levels from under-8s right through to the senior team, after Chris Chantler.

On 20 October 2015, Evans joined League One club Walsall on a one-month loan deal. He made his Walsall debut on the same day against Barnsley and scored the opening goal in a 0–2 away win. On 24 November 2015, after "playing week in, week out", he extended his loan at Walsall until 9 January 2016 and was then extended again until 26 January 2016, the maximum allowed time for an emergency loan deal. On 16 January 2016 he was recalled by parent club Manchester City as an offer had been made for a permanent move away from the club.

On 19 January 2016, Evans joined Championship club Reading on a three-and-a-half-year deal until 2019. Evans scored his first goal for the club in a 1–1 draw with Derby County on 1 October 2016.

On 31 July 2018, Evans joined Championship club Derby County for an undisclosed fee, believed to be around £1m, on a 3-year deal He signed a contract extension in August 2020 to take him through until the summer of 2022.

On 1 February 2021, Evans joined Championship club Millwall for an undisclosed fee. He scored his first goal for Millwall, a late equaliser, in a 1-1 draw against Luton Town on 23 February 2021.

Career statistics

References

External links

1994 births
Living people
People from Cheadle, Greater Manchester
Footballers from Greater Manchester
English footballers
England youth international footballers
Association football midfielders
Manchester City F.C. players
Crewe Alexandra F.C. players
Scunthorpe United F.C. players
Walsall F.C. players
Reading F.C. players
Derby County F.C. players
Millwall F.C. players
English Football League players